Postal codes were adopted in Ghana on 18 October 2017, following the launch of the National Digital Address System. As a joint venture between Ghana Post (with support from the Government of Ghana]) and Vokacom Ltd as GhanaPost GPS, the Digital Address System assigned postal codes and unique addresses to every square in Ghana.

Ghana's postal codes are alphanumeric. The first two characters form the postcode district - the first letter represents the region, and the second character represents the district in which the address is located. The next three to five digits represent the postcode area and identify a more precise location within area.

Together, the postcode district and postcode area form the postal code. For example, the Kwame Nkrumah Memorial Park & Mausoleum in Accra is located in postal code GA184, where GA represents the postcode district - G for the Greater Accra Region and A for the Accra Metropolitan District - and 184 represents the postcode area.

Examples of postal codes are GA107, EO1070, and N503074.

Format
The simplest address format, recognized by the national post, Ghana Post is: Recipient Name, Street Name, Digital Address, Area, Region. This is being implemented by Scuttle Box and Ghana Post which provide your address on your mailbox, to ensure there is consistency and accuracy in all deliveries and addressing. The postal codes are alphanumeric and are variable in length, ranging from five to seven characters. In general, five-digit postal codes denote metropolitan districts and major urban areas, six-digit postal codes denote municipal districts and peri-urban areas, and seven-digit postal codes denote ordinary districts and small towns.

Each postal code is divided into two parts: the postcode district and postcode area. The center of each postcode district falls within the district capital and is designated as postcode area "000". For example, postal code GA000 denotes the center of postcode district GA within Accra, the district capital of the Accra Metropolitan district, and corresponds to the 5 meter square area around the Jubilee House.

Postcode areas are numbered sequentially and spiral out anticlockwise from the center of the postcode district, with sequential postcode areas located 500 meters apart. For example, postal code GA008, which corresponds to the area of the 37 Military Hospital in Accra is 500 meters from GA009 and suggests proximity to the center of the district - proximity to postal code GA000.

Availability of the algorithm

The list of frequently asked questions, as of December 2017, does not state if/where the algorithm for generating the postcodes is publicly available, or how the algorithm is licensed. It is also not stated if/how bulk conversion of coordinates into postcodes is possible. This suggests that, at least at present, the algorithm is likely proprietary. This is a feature also of other postcode systems, although open postcode systems are also available. Open postcode-like systems include the Open Location Code. An example for a proprietary system that was subsequently made available under an open license includes Postcodes in the United Kingdom.

References

Ghana